Ciara (Ciara Harris, born 1985; pronounced Sierra) is an American singer-songwriter.

Ciara may also refer to:

 Ciara (given name), a popular Irish female name
 Ciara: The Evolution, an album by Ciara (2006)
 Ciara (album), an album by Ciara (2013)
 Jay-Z & Ciara Live, 2009 summer concert tour
 Saint Cera, or Ciara, an Irish abbess in the 7th century
 LÉ Ciara (P42), a patrol vessel in the Irish Naval Service
 Storm Ciara in north-western Europe in February 2020

See also 
 Ciara (given name)#People, a list of people named Ciara
 
 Chiara (disambiguation)